Dr. Agnes Murgoci (1875 – 7 May 1929), was an Australian born, English zoologist and folklorist.

Agnes Kelly (later Murgoci) was born in Adelaide, South Australia in 1875, the daughter of Adam Kelly, formerly of Glasgow, and Helen Beveridge. Her parents returned to England with Agnes, when she was three years old. Kelly attended school at Dollar Academy and entered Bedford College in 1892. She graduated in 1896, obtaining her B.Sc. with first class honours in zoology. She moved to Germany to undertake a PhD from the University of Munich. She graduated alongside Maria Gordon, as the first women to earn PhD's from the University of Munich in 1900.

Kelly met Gheorghe Munteanu-Murgoci, a Romanian professor of mineralogy during her time in Munich. They married in 1904 and moved to Bucharest. Their children, Helen and Radu were born in Romania. Agnes Murgoci published articles on the folklore of her new home, especially early studies on vampirism, and a book, Rumania and the Rumanians. Her works appeared in the journal of the Folklore Society.

Her husband died in 1925. During World War I, Agnes Murgoci and her children fled to England and settled in Bristol.

Murgoci died in England on 7 May 1929, following a car accident on the Isle of Wight. She was survived by her children.

Legacy 
Murgoci collected a large number of traditional Romanian peasant costumes and rugs. These were donated to the Scottish National Museum by her daughter, as the Murgoci collection. Her papers are held in the Royal Holloway, University of London archives.

References

External links

1875 births
1929 deaths
People educated at Dollar Academy
English folklorists
Women folklorists
Australian emigrants to the United Kingdom